Nofim (lit. Views) is an Israeli settlement on the western edge of the northern West Bank. Located  adjacent to Yakir and about 30 km east of Tel Aviv, it falls under the jurisdiction of Shomron Regional Council.

The international community considers Israeli settlements in the West Bank illegal under international law, but the Israeli government disputes this.

History
According to ARIJ, Israel confiscated  625 dunams of land from the nearby Palestinian village of Deir Istiya in  order to construct Nofim.

The settlement was founded in 1986 on state lands by a group of secular Jewish Israelis. The Kana Stream passes to the north, west and south.

References

External links
Photos of Nofim

Non-religious Israeli settlements
Populated places established in 1986
1986 establishments in the Palestinian territories
Secular Jewish culture in Israel
Israeli settlements in the West Bank